Simon II may refer to:

 Simon II (High Priest) (219–199 BCE)
 Simon II de Montfort (c. 1068–1104)
 Simon II de Senlis, Earl of Huntingdon-Northampton (c. 1098–1153)
 Simon II, Duke of Lorraine (1140–1207)
 Simon II of Clermont (c. 1210 – 1285/86), Seigneur (Lord) of Ailly, Maulette and Nesle (in Picardy)
 Simon II of Clermont-Nesle (born after 1250–1312/13), French bishop of Noyon (1297–1301) and Bishop-count of Beauvais (1301–c. 1312)
 Simon II, Count of Sponheim-Kreuznach (c. 1270 – 1336)
 Simon II, Lord of Lippe (died 1344)
 Simon II of Isenburg-Kempenich, ruled 1341–1367
 Simon II of Kartli  (c. early 1610s–1630/31)
 Simon II Gurieli (died 1792), Georgian Prince of Guria 1788/89–1792
 Simeon II, King of Bulgaria

See also
 Simeon II (disambiguation)